Erika Haydee Varela Huerta (born 3 April 1994) is a Mexican racing cyclist. She rode in the women's road race at the 2015 UCI Road World Championships.

Major results

2014
 2nd Road race, National Road Championships
2015
 1st  Road race, National Road Championships
 4th Overall Vuelta Internacional Femenina a Costa Rica
1st Points classification
1st Stages 1 & 4
2016
 1st Stage 4 Vuelta Internacional Femenina a Costa Rica
 6th Clasico FVCiclismo Corre Por la VIDA
 8th Copa Federación Venezolana de Ciclismo

References

External links

1994 births
Living people
Mexican female cyclists
Place of birth missing (living people)
21st-century Mexican women
20th-century Mexican women